In a radio receiver, the capture effect, or FM capture effect, is a phenomenon associated with FM reception in which only the stronger of two signals at, or near, the same frequency or channel will be demodulated.

FM phenomenon 
The capture effect is defined as the complete suppression of the weaker signal at the receiver's limiter (if present) where the weaker signal is not amplified, but attenuated.  When both signals are nearly equal in strength or are fading independently, the receiver may rapidly switch from one to another and exhibit flutter.

The capture effect can occur at the signal limiter, or in the demodulation stage for circuits that do not require a signal limiter. Some types of radio receiver circuits have a stronger capture effect than others.  The measurement of how well a receiver rejects a second signal on the same frequency is called its capture ratio. It is measured as the lowest ratio of the power of two signals that will result in the suppression of the weaker signal. 

The capture effect phenomenon was first documented in 1938 by General Electric engineers conducting test transmissions. Two experimental FM stations, located 15 miles (24 km) apart in Albany and Schenectady, New York, were configured to transmit on the same frequency, in order to study how this would affect reception. It was determined that, for most of the path between the two stations, only one of the signals could be heard, with the complete elimination of the other. It was concluded that this effect occurred whenever the stronger signal was about twice as strong as the weaker one. This was significantly different than the case with amplitude modulation signals, where the general standard for broadcasting stations was that to avoid objectionable interference the stronger signal had to be about twenty times that of the weaker one. The capture effect thus allowed co-channel FM broadcasting stations to be located somewhat closer to each other than AM ones, without causing mutual interference.

AM immunity 
Amplitude modulation, or AM radio, transmission does not exhibit this effect. For AM reception, the receiver tracks the signal strength of the AM signal as the basis for demodulation. This allows signals to be tracked as just another change in amplitude, so it is possible for an AM receiver to demodulate several carriers at the same time, resulting in an audio mix.

The ability to receive multiple signals simultaneously is in some cases considered beneficial and is one reason that the aviation industry, and others, have chosen to use AM rather than FM for communications. 

Phenomena similar to the capture effect are described in AM when offset carriers of different strengths are present in the passband of a receiver.  For example, the aviation glideslope vertical guidance clearance beam is sometimes described as a "capture effect" system, even though it operates using AM signals.

Digital modulation 
For digital modulation schemes it has been shown that for properly implemented on-off keying/amplitude-shift keying systems, co-channel rejection can be better than for frequency-shift keying systems.

See also 
 Near–far problem

Notes

References

External links 
 FM Limiter & Capture Ratio, by Dietmar Rudolph

Radio
Broadcast engineering